Torrenticnemis is a genus of white-legged damselfly in the family Platycnemididae. There is one described species in Torrenticnemis, T. filicornis.

References

Further reading

 
 
 

Platycnemididae
Articles created by Qbugbot